Philip Herbert (born 28 January 1957 in London) is an English actor and mime artist, best known as his comedic alter ego, Hugh Jelly, a sidekick to comedian Julian Clary on the 1989–90 quiz show Sticky Moments with Julian Clary.

In addition to several TV roles, Herbert appeared as Hermi Odle, one of Jabba the Hutt's henchmen in Return of the Jedi  and as Ginger in Carry On Columbus. More recently he has appeared on The Bill, Casualty, Trial & Retribution  and The Family.

References

External links

English male television actors
English male film actors
1957 births
Living people